José Gutiérrez (1903 – death date unknown) was a Cuban pitcher in the Negro leagues in the 1920s.

A native of Havana, Cuba, Gutiérrez played for the Cuban Stars (West) in 1926. In 62 recorded games that season, he posted 70 hits with two home runs and 29 RBI in 258 plate appearances.

References

External links
 and Seamheads

1903 births
Year of death missing
Place of death missing
Cuban Stars (West) players
Baseball outfielders
Baseball players from Havana
Cuban expatriate baseball players in the United States